Ranutovac is a village in the municipality of Vranje, Serbia. According to the 2002 Serbia census, the village has a population of 490 people.

History
A Bronze-Age necropolis was discovered in the vicinity of Ranutovac in June 2012. The necropolis dates back to the Early Bronze Age - based between 2,000 and 1,800 BC.

References

Populated places in Pčinja District